Conus brunneofilaris is a species of sea snail, a marine gastropod mollusk in the family Conidae, the cone snails and their allies.

Like all species within the genus Conus, these snails are predatory and venomous. They are capable of "stinging" humans, therefore live ones should be handled carefully or not at all.

Distribution
This species occurs in the Caribbean Sea off Panama

Description 
The maximum recorded shell length is 14 mm.

Habitat 
Minimum recorded depth is 65 m. Maximum recorded depth is 65 m.

References

 Petuch, E. J. 1990. A new molluscan faunule from the Caribbean coast of Panama. Nautilus 104: 57–70.
 Tucker J.K. & Tenorio M.J. (2009) Systematic classification of Recent and fossil conoidean gastropods. Hackenheim: Conchbooks. 296 pp
 Puillandre N., Duda T.F., Meyer C., Olivera B.M. & Bouchet P. (2015). One, four or 100 genera? A new classification of the cone snails. Journal of Molluscan Studies. 81: 1–23

External links
 The Conus Biodiversity website
 Cone Shells – Knights of the Sea
 

brunneofilaris
Gastropods described in 1990